Porelli is an Italian surname. Notable people with the surname include:

Gianluigi Porelli (1930–2009), Italian basketball executive
Giuseppe Porelli (1897–1982), Italian actor

See also
Morelli

Italian-language surnames